is a former Japanese football player.

Playing career
Takahashi was born in Saitama Prefecture on June 28, 1980. He joined his local club Urawa Reds from youth team in 1999. On May 8, he debuted against Júbilo Iwata. However he could only play this match. In 2001, he moved to Montedio Yamagata. However he could not play at all in the match and retired end of 2001 season.

Club statistics

References

External links

1980 births
Living people
Association football people from Saitama Prefecture
Japanese footballers
J1 League players
J2 League players
Urawa Red Diamonds players
Montedio Yamagata players
Association football midfielders